Sabbahiyeh (also Romanized as Şabbāḩīyeh) is a village in Hoseyni Rural District, in the Central District of Shadegan County, Khuzestan Province, Iran. At the 2006 census, its population was 44, in 5 families.

References 

Populated places in Shadegan County